{|{{Infobox aircraft begin
  |name = Líf
  |image = Puma TF-LIF IMG 7691 (9516038864).jpg
  |caption = Líf in August 2013.
}}

|}Líf, also known as TF-LÍF, is an Aérospatiale AS-332L1 Super Puma helicopter used by the Icelandic Coast Guard. It is named after Líf, the only woman foretold to survive the events of Ragnarök from Norse mythology, and is the first Coast Guard aircraft to bear the name. It is the longest serving helicopter in the history of the ICG and gained national fame when it rescued 39 sailors in three separate incidents during a six-day period in March 1997.

HistoryLíf was ordered in June 1994 and delivered 23 June 1995. Its formal arrival at Reykjavík Airport was greeted by the president of Iceland, Vigdís Finnbogadóttir. 

During a six-day period in 1997, Líf rescued 39 sailors in three separate incidents. On 5 March, 19 sailors from the cargo ship  were rescued aboard Líf after it suffered engine failure and ran aground on the south coast of Iceland, east of Þjórsá. One crewmember from  washed overboard during the rescue operations and drowned. The day after, 10 seamen from the fishing vessel Þorsteinn GK were saved aboard Líf after the ship lost engine power and drifted towards the rocky cliffs of Krísuvíkurberg.

On 9 March 2004, Líf rescued all 16 crewmembers of the trawler Baldvin Þorsteinsson EA-10 after it ran aground in Skarðsfjara on the south coast of Iceland.

On 19 December 2006, Líf rescued seven sailors from  after their rigid inflatable boat overturned in rough seas during the rescue operations of the stranding of the cargo ship Wilson Muuga. Its sister helicopter, Sif, meanwhile saved 12 crewmembers of the cargo ship.

In 2020, it was decided that Líf would be put up for sale. In May 2022, it was in storage at the Coast Guard hangar at Reykjavík Airport, having not been used since 2020.

Notable captains
Benóný Ásgrímsson

Further reading
 Útkall TF-Líf - Sextíu menn í lífshættu, 1997. : Book by Óttar Sveinsson about Líf. 
 Þrautgóðir á raunastund, 2017. : Book by Steinar J. Lúðvíksson featuring the story of Lífs rescue of 39 sailors in March 1997.

References

Icelandic Coast Guard
Helicopters
Rescue aviation
Individual aircraft